The Graveyard of the Atlantic Museum is a maritime museum that focuses on the maritime history and shipwrecks of the Outer Banks of North Carolina.  The museum is located in Hatteras Village, the southernmost community on Hatteras Island, North Carolina, and opened in 2002.

Exhibits 
The Graveyard of the Atlantic refers to the coastal region of the Outer Banks that contain the remains of hundreds of ships that were sunk due to war, piracy or weather.  The museum's exhibits feature many artifacts recovered from shipwrecks, including a German Enigma machine from the German submarine U-85 that was sunk in 1942.  One gallery focuses on the discovery and exploration of shipwrecks, and the science of preserving these ships and artifacts.

Other exhibits include ship models, exhibits about General Billy Mitchell and his ship bombing demonstrations off the Cape Hatteras coast in 1921, explorers and colonists, lifesaving and rescue operations, and piracy and famous area pirates including Edward Low, Anne Bonny and Blackbeard.  Maritime military displays include American Civil War blockade runners and the sinking of the  ironclad warship, and World War II submarine attacks off the coast.

The museum is a branch museum of the North Carolina Museum of History.

Admission is free, and the museum is open Monday through Saturday.

See also
List of maritime museums in the United States

References

External links
 

Maritime museums in North Carolina
Museums in Dare County, North Carolina
Hatteras Island
Historic Albemarle Tour
Museums established in 2002
2002 establishments in North Carolina